Stone skipping and stone skimming are considered related but distinct activities: both refer to the art of throwing a flat stone across the water in such a way (usually sidearm) that it bounces off the surface. The objective of "skipping" is to see how many times a stone can bounce before it sinks into the water; the objective of "skimming" is to see how far a bouncing stone can travel across the water before it sinks into the water. In Japan, the practice is referred to as Mizu Kiri, which loosely translates to "water cutting". In Mizu Kiri contests, both skimming and skipping principles, as well as a throw's overall aesthetic quality, are taken into account to determine the winners.

History
The act of skipping stones was mentioned by Marcus Minucius Felix in his dialogue Octavius, in which he described children playing a game on the beach. Greek scholar Julius Pollux also noted the game in Onomastikon. Among the first documented evidence stone skipping as a sport was in England, where it was described as "Ducks and Drakes" in 1583. An early explanation of the physics of stone-skipping was provided by Lazzaro Spallanzani in the 18th century.

Records
The world record for the number of skips, according to the Guinness Book of Records, is 88, by Kurt "Mountain Man" Steiner. The cast was achieved on September 6, 2013, at Red Bridge in the Allegheny National Forest, Pennsylvania. The previous record was 65 skips, by Max Steiner (no relation), set at Riverfront Park, Franklin, Pennsylvania. Before him, the record was 51 skips, set by Russell Byars on July 19, 2007, skipping at the same location. Kurt Steiner also held the world record between 2002 and 2007 with a throw of 40 skips, achieved in competition in Franklin, PA.

The Guinness World Record for the furthest distance skimmed using natural stone stands at 121.8m for men, established by Dougie Isaacs (Scotland), and 52.5m for women, thrown by Nina Luginbuhl (Switzerland). These records were made on 28 May 2018 at Abernant Lake, Llanwrtyd Wells, Powys, Wales.

Championships
The "Big Four" American stone skipping contests include (in order of establishment and participant rankings): 
 The Mackinac Island championship, held on July 4 in northern Michigan (entry by invite only; must win prior Mackinac Open or Pennsylvania Qualifier to enter); 
 The Pennsylvania championship, held usually the 3rd Saturday of August in Franklin, PA, about one hour southeast of Erie (winners invited to the subsequent Michigan contest);
 The Vermont championship (about one month after Pennsylvania) on the shore of Lake Paran, North of Bennington; and
 The Great Southern championship in Arkansas (Labor Day weekend).

Former world champion Coleman-McGhee founded the North American Stone Skipping Association (NASSA) in 1989 in Driftwood, Texas. NASSA-sanctioned world championships were held from 1989 through 1992 in Wimberley, Texas. The next official NASSA World Championship is expected to be held at Platja d'en Ros beach in Cadaqués, Catalonia, Spain..

A stone skimming championship takes place every year in Easdale, Scotland, where relative distance counts as opposed to the number of skips, as tends to be the case outside of the US.  Since 1997, competitors from all over the world have taken part in the World Stone Skimming Championships (WSSC) in a disused water-filled quarry on Easdale Island using sea-worn Easdale slate of maximum 3" diameter. Each participant gets three throws and the stone must bounce/skip at least twice to count (i.e. 3 water touches minimum). The WSSC for 2020-2022 were cancelled due to coronavirus concerns. The next is scheduled for Sept 2023.

Other domestic distance-based championships in the UK are currently the Welsh and British, but they were cancelled in 2020 and 2021 for reasons including the COVID-19 pandemic. The British is next due to be held in 2023. Japan holds competitions where both skimming and skipping principles, as well as a throw's overall aesthetic quality, are taken into account to determine the winners. At present, there is also a competition at Ermatingen in Switzerland and occasionally in the Netherlands (both skimming/distance-based).

Men's World Skimming Championship winners by year 

2020 and 2021 Championships cancelled due to aspects of the COVID-19 pandemic.

Women's World Skimming Championship winners by year 

2020 Championship cancelled due to the COVID-19 pandemic.

Underlying physics

Although stone skipping occurs at the air-water interface, surface tension has very little to do with the physics of stone-skipping.  Instead, the stones are a flying wing akin to a planing boat or Frisbee, generating lift from a body angled upwards relative to a high horizontal velocity.  

The same physical laws apply to stones traveling in air or in water, but the effect is only comparable to gravity when immersed in water, because of the latter fluid's higher density.  The result is a characteristic bouncing or skipping motion, in which a series of extremely brief collisions with the water superficially appear to support the stone.  

During each collision, the stone's horizontal velocity is approximately constant and its vertical motion can be approximated as a distorted pendulum.  The stone is only partially immersed, and the lift applied at the back torques the stone towards tumbling.  That torque is stabilized by the gyroscope effect: the stone-skipper imparts a perpendicular initial angular momentum much larger than the collisional impulse, so that the latter induces only a small precession in the axis of rotation. 

Stones improperly oriented at the moment of collision will not rebound: the largest observed angle of attack preceding a rebound occurred at an angle of approximately 45°.  Conversely, a stone making angle 20° with the water's surface may rebound even at relatively low velocities, as well as minimizing the time and energy spent in the following collision.  

In principle, a stone can skip arbitrarily-long distances, given a sufficiently high initial speed and rotation.  Each collision saps an approximately constant kinetic energy from the stone (a dynamical equation equivalent to Coulomb friction), as well as imparting an approximately constant angular impulse.  Experiments suggest that initial angular momentum's stabilizing effect limits most stones: even "long-lived" throws still have high translational velocities when they finally sink.

Names
 English: "skipping stones" or "skipping rocks" (North America); "lobsta cutting" (Cape Cod, North America); "stone skimming" or "ducks and drakes" (Britain); "skiting" (Scotland) and "stone skiffing" (Ireland)
 Bengali: "frog jumps" (Bengbaji); "kingfisher" (Machhranga)
 Bulgarian: "frogs" (жабки)
 Cantonese: "skipping (little) stones" (片石(仔)) [pin3 sek6 (zai2)]
 Catalan: "making step-stone bridges" (fer passeres); "making furrows" (fer rigalets); "skipping stones" (llençar passanelles)
 Czech: "to make/throw froggies" (dělat (házet) žabky/žabičky – countrywide and generally intelligible); "to make ducks/drakes/ducklings" (dělat kačky/kačeny/kačery/kačenky/káčata/káčírky - in East Bohemia and parts of Moravia); "little fishes" (rybičky/rybky); "saucers" (mističky); "plates/dishes" (talíře); "wagtails" (podlisky/podlíšky/lyšky); "divers" (potápky); "pot-lids" (pokličky/pukličky); "flaps" (plisky/plesky); "plops" (žbluňky); "darts" (šipky); "bubbles" (bubliny); "Jews" (židy); "figures" (páni/panáky); "gammers"/"wagtails" (babky); "dolls"/"girls"/"dragonflies" (panenky); "to ferry Virgin Mary" (převážet panenku Mariu)
 Danish: "slipping" (smut or at smutte); "to make slips" (at slå smut)
 Dutch: "ketsen" (bouncing)
 Estonian: "throwing a burbot" (lutsu viskama)
 Finnish: "throwing bread/a sandwich" (heittää leipiä/voileipiä)
 French: "making ricochets" (faire des ricochets)
 German: "stone skipping" (Steinehüpfen); colloquially i.a. "flitting" (flitschen, old synonym of schwirren, "whirring"), its diminutive flitscheln, and "bouncing" (ditschen, a variant of titschen); older synonyms rarely used are i.a. "leading the bride" (die Braut führen), "throwing frogs" (Frösche werfen), "shooting/throwing maids/virgins" (Jungfern schießen/werfen), "skiffing" (schiffeln, schippern), "springing" (schnellern, from schnellen, "springing" or "darting"), and "pebbling" (steineln)
 Greek: "little frogs" (βατραχάκια)
 Hungarian: "making it to waddle", lit. "making it walk like a duck" (kacsáztatás)
 Italian: rimbalzello
 Japanese: "cutting water" (「水切り」[mizu kiri])
 Korean: mulsujebi (물수제비), meaning water and Korean soup sujebi.
 Lithuanian: "making frogs" (daryti varlytes)
 Macedonian: "frogs" (жабчиња)
 Mandarin: da shui piao (打水漂)
 Marathi: bhakrya kadhne
 Mongolian: "making the rabbit leap" (tuulai kharailgakh); "making the dog lick" (nokhoi doloolgokh) 
 Nigerian: "the way a dragonfly skips across the water" (lami lami)
 Norwegian: "fish bounce" (fiskesprett)
 Polish: "letting the ducks out" (puszczanie kaczek)
 Portuguese "water shearing" ("capar a água"); "making tiny hats" ("fazer chapeletas")
 Russian: "frogs" (лягушки [Lyagushki])
 Serbo-Croatian: "(to throw) little frogs" ([bacati] žabice) 
 Spanish: "making white-caps" (hacer cabrillas); "making little frogs" (hacer ranitas); making ducklings (hacer patitos)
 Swedish: "throwing a sandwich" (kasta smörgås or kasta macka)
 Telugu: "frog jumps" (kappa gantulu)
 Turkish: "skimming stone" (taş sektirme)
 Ukrainian: "letting the frogs out" (zapuskaty zhabky)
 Farsi/Persian: "Syrian bashing" (سوری زدن)
Vietnamese: "ricochet" (ném thia lia); "tossing stone" (liếc đá, lia đá)

In popular culture
The lead character of the 2001 film Amélie skips stones along the Canal Saint-Martin in Paris as a plot point, and picks up good skipping stones when she spots them.

See also 
Animal locomotion on the water surface
Bouncing bomb
Ricochet
Rock balancing (another hobby or pastime using stones)
Skip bombing

References

Further reading 
Coleman, Jerry. The Secrets of Stone Skipping, Stone Age Sports Publications, January 1996 
Lorenz, Ralph. Spinning Flight: Dynamics of Frisbees, Boomerangs, Samaras and Skipping Stones, Copernicus, New York, September 2006

External links 

 John Zehr's Patent, "Skipping stones and method of use thereof", US Patent 4553758
 John "Skippy" Kolar Skipumentary
 NASSA homepage
 Easdale's Stone Skimming World Championships
 World Championships on the BBC
 Wales Open Stone Skimming Championships
 Mackinac Island Stone Skipping & Gerplunking Club
 The Stone Skipping Hall of Fame (virtual)
 European Championships Stone Skimming
 Rock in River Festival, Pennsylvania Stone Skipping Championship
 European Championship Stone Skimming

Games of physical skill
Stones
Water sports